{{DISPLAYTITLE:C2H2N2O2}}
The molecular formula C2H2N2O2 (molar mass: 86.05 g/mol, exact mass: 86.0116 u) may refer to:

 Furoxan, or 1,2,5-oxadiazole 2-oxide
 Sydnone